Tunisia has participated in two editions of the African Nations Championship. In the 2009 edition, she is represented by the olympic team, under the management of Mondher Kebaier. Tunisia is eliminated there in the qualification phase. In 2011, under the leadership of Sami Trabelsi, Tunisia qualified for the finals and won the championship by beating Angola in the final. In 2014, placed under the direction of Nabil Maâloul, she was eliminated in the qualification phase.

In the 2016 edition, under the leadership of Henryk Kasperczak, Tunisia qualified for the finals, but Hatem Missaoui led the team in Rwanda. Tunisia was eliminated in the quarterfinals by Mali. In the next edition, the Tunisian Football Federation announced that Tunisia will not participate in the 2018 African Nations Championship due to the participation of the first team in the 2018 FIFA World Cup.

In 2020 African Nations Championship qualification, Tunisia faces Libya two home and away games, winning the first match 1–0 at Stade Olympique de Radès and the second 2–1 at Stade Boubker Ammar; Anice Badri scores the goals for Tunisia in both cases. The national team qualified for the final phase but, on 20 December 2019, the qualification was withdrawn by the Tunisian Football Federation due to the intensity of the matches.

African Nations Championship record

2011 African Nations Championship 

Beginning in 2011, Tunisia was marked by the revolution. under new coach Sami Trabelsi, Tunisia played two home and away matches against Morocco and won 1–1 in the first leg at the Stade Olympique de Radès and 2–2 in the return in the Stade Mohammed V thanks to the goals of Saber Khalifa and Mehdi Meriah, achieving qualification for the first time Tunisia is in the African Nations Championship.

The team was led by Sami Traboulsi for the 2011 African Nations Championship held in Sudan. After the group stage where she finished easily for the first time, a 1–1 draw against Angola, a 3–1 victory against Rwanda and another 2–0 victory against Senegal, she found in the quarter–finals the defending champions DR Congo and won 1–0.

In the semi–finals, faced Algeria, after a two–hour battle 1–1, Tunisia qualified on penalties. In the final match, Angola found the ease of winning the match and crowning the title with a score of 3–0. Zouheir Dhaouadi was also selected as the best player in the tournament.

Group stage

Quarter-finals

Semi-finals

Final 
Angola started off well piling feverish pressure on the Eagles of Carthage through the right flank but lacked a lot of polish with their finishing. Both teams raised the adrenalin levels of their fans with Tunisia coming close to scoring in the 13th minutes but the Palancas Negras man between the woodworks Lamá made a point blank save. Three minutes after, Zouheir Dhaouadi came close to scoring but the Angolan goalkeeper anticipated well to block it from his post.

Mejdi Traoui's powerful drive in the 20th minutes was punched aside by Lama who was well positioned to deny the Eagles their first goal. Adel Chedli sent the Carthage fans on their foot at the Al-Merrikh Stadium in the 37th minutes but he missed the post by an inch. Their one-two-one-two upfront kept mesmerizing the Angolan guardsmen but their finishing were poorly executed.

The dingdong battle continued into the interval. The north Africans returned from the interval much determined. They set the stadium alive two minutes into the second half when Traoui Mejdi Traoui in the ball from waist level with a perfect right foot from Dhaouadi's cross from the left flank.

Tunisia’s onslaughts began paying off from the 74th minute when Zouhaier doubled their lead with a fine left foot roll of the ball that went past Lamá straight into the woodwork. As the game wears on substitute Oussama Darragi put the final nail on the coffin in the 80th minutes to gift the north Africans the ultimate.

Details

2016 African Nations Championship 
Tunisia participated in the qualification for the 2016 African Nations Championship in June 2015, in a group that includes Morocco and Libya. Tunisia played four home and away games under Henryk Kasperczak and qualified for the finals with one win, one draw and two losses.

Hatem Missaoui leads the team in the group stage in Rwanda, with two draws against Guinea 2–2 and Nigeria 1–1 and a victory over Niger 5–0, the widest of the tournament history; Tunisia is however eliminated in the quarter–finals by Mali 1–2.

Group stage

Quarter-finals

Notes

References 

Tunisia national football team